This is a list of Rice Owls baseball seasons. The Rice Owls baseball team has represented Rice University dating back to its inception in 1913. The Owls played as a founding member of the Southwest Conference from its inception until the conference disbanded following the 1996 season. Since then, Rice has played in both the Western Athletic Conference and Conference USA. 

Rice won the College World Series in 2003.

Season results

Notes

References

 
Rice
Rice Owls baseball seasons
Rice Owls baseball seasons